The director of the National Security Agency (DIRNSA) is the highest-ranking official of the National Security Agency, which is a defense agency within the U.S. Department of Defense. The director of the NSA also concurrently serves as the Chief of the Central Security Service (CHCSS) and as the commander of U.S. Cyber Command (USCYBERCOM). As the director of the NSA and the chief of the CSC, the officeholder reports to the under secretary of defense for intelligence, and as the commander of U.S. Cyber Command, the officeholder reports directly to the secretary of defense.

The nominee must be confirmed via majority vote by the Senate. In accordance with Department of Defense Directive 5100.20, dated 23 December 1971, the director of the NSA must always be a commissioned officer of the military services. As the assignment is currently part of a tri-hatted position, the director of the NSA is appointed to the grade of a four-star general or admiral during the period of his incumbency. The director's deputy is always a technically experienced civilian.

AFSA directors
The Armed Forces Security Agency was the predecessor to the National Security Agency and existed from 1949 to 1952.

NSA directors

References

External links
 List of former NSA directors